.jo is the country code top-level domain (ccTLD) for Jordan. A local contact is required to register a domain name under .jo. It used to be administered by the NITC and is now administered by Jordan's Ministry of Digital Economy and Entrepreneurship.

Jordan also has an internationalized country code top-level domain,

Structure 
Registration directly at second level, under .jo is possible, but there is a number of second level domains used for registrations as well. Registration under the IDN  is open for all public and private organisations and companies.

References

External links 
 http://www.nitc.gov.jo

Country code top-level domains
Communications in Jordan
Computer-related introductions in 1994

sv:Toppdomän#J